is a district located in Gifu Prefecture, Japan.
, the district has an estimated population of 72,109. The total area is 876.65 km2.

The area of the former village of Tokuyama in this district will be flooded by the Tokuyama Dam.

Towns and villages
Ibigawa
Ikeda
Ōno

District Timeline
 April 1, 1987 - The village of Tokuyama merged into the village of Fujihashi. 
 January 31, 2005 - The villages of Fujihashi, Kasuga, Kuze, Sakauchi, and Tanigumi merged into the expanded town of Ibigawa.

Notes

 
Districts in Gifu Prefecture